Musharrof Husain Khan (also M. H. Khan; born 17 July 1933) is a former Bangladeshi academic. He served as the 5th vice-chancellor of Bangladesh University of Engineering and Technology. Also he served as first vice-chancellor of Ahsanullah University of Science and Technology

Education and career
Khan passed matriculation examination from State High School in Rajnandgaon in 1949 and intermediate examination from Dhaka College in 1951. He earned his bachelor's in mechanical engineering from Ahsanullah Engineering College in 1955. He received master's and Ph.D. from Texas A&M University in 1962 and 1964 respectively.

Khan joined as a lecturer at Ahsanullah Engineering College in December 1956. He served as the vice-chancellor of Bangladesh University of Engineering and Technology from April 1987 to April 1991. He also served as a vice-chancellor of Ahsanullah University of Science and Technology.

References

1933 births
Living people
People from Dhaka
Dhaka College alumni
Bangladesh University of Engineering and Technology alumni
Academic staff of Bangladesh University of Engineering and Technology
Texas A&M University alumni
Vice-Chancellors of Bangladesh University of Engineering and Technology